Brychan Brycheiniog was a legendary 5th-century king of Brycheiniog (Brecknockshire, alternatively Breconshire) in Mid Wales.

Life

According to Celtic hagiography Brychan was born in Ireland, the son of a Prince Anlach, son of Coronac, and his wife, Marchel, heiress of the Welsh kingdom of Garthmadrun (Brycheiniog), which the couple later inherited. Upon his father's death, he returned to Garthmadrun and changed its name to Brycheiniog. Brychan's name may be a Welsh version of the Irish name Broccán and that of his grandfather Coronac may represent Cormac. Brychan's education was entrusted to one Drichan.

The Life of St. Cadoc by Lifris (c. 1100) portrays Brychan fighting Arthur, Cai and Bedivere because of King Gwynllyw of Gwynllwg's abduction of his daughter St. Gwladys from his court in Talgarth.

Portraiture and veneration
He is occasionally described as an undocumented saint but the traditional literature does not call him a saint, referring to him as a patriarch instead, and he has no churches named for him. A 15th-century stained glass window in the parish church at St Neot in Cornwall, supposedly depicts Brychan, seated and crowned, holding in his arms eleven children. This, however, has been described by a standard modern guide as "God with Souls in his lap". He is given a saint day on April 6.

Children of Brychan
According to Christian tradition, Brychan was married three times – to Prawst ferch Tydwal, Banhadlwedd ferch Banadi, and Gwladys – and had a very large family. These wives are mentioned in several manuscripts, including those by William Worcester, John Leland, and Nicholas Roscarrock. The number of children attributed to him varies from twelve to sixty-three, the number most frequently encountered being twenty-four. There are two main lists however, one of Welsh origin and one of Cornish origin. Most of his children appear to have travelled from Brecon to evangelise Cornwall and North Devon, where they are now venerated, but there is little agreement between the two lists.

The number of Brychan's children may have grown over time, as more and more secular people as well as saints wished to claim descent from one of the "Holy Families of Britain". Listed below are children from Welsh, Cornish, Irish, and Breton sources:

Sons in Welsh sources
The sons listed in the Cognacio Brychan, De Situ Brecheniauc and the genealogies of Jesus College MS 20 are Cynog, Rhain Dremrudd, Clydwyn, Arthen, Papai, Dingad, Berwyn and Rhydog. Also listed, but not in all three, are Cynon, Pasgen, Cylflifer, Marthaerun and Rhun. Other Welsh sources claim the following additional sons: Caian, Cynbryd, Cynfran, Cynin, Dogfan, Dyfnan, Dyfrig, Hychan, Llecheu, Neffei, Rhawin, Llofan, Llonio, Heilin, Afallach and Gwynnws.

Daughters in Welsh sources
The De Situ Brecheniauc lists: Meleri, Hunydd, Gwladys, Ceingar, Tudglid, Nyfain, Gwawr, Marchell, Lluan, Gwrygon Goddeu, Arianwen, Bethan, Ceinwen (Keyne), Cerddych, Clydai, Cynheiddon (identified with Saint Endelienta), Dwynwen, Eiliwedd, Goleudydd, Gwen, Lludd, Tudful, Tudwystl and Tybie. Other Welsh sources claim the following additional daughters: Beiol (Bilo), Tydieu, Eufail, Hawystl, Edwen, Gwenrhiw, Tudwen, Callwen, Gwenfyl, Gwennan and Mwynwen.

Descendants in Cornish sources
Listed in the Life of Saint Nectan are, by his wife, Gwladys:
Adwen, Canauc (Cynog), Cleder (Clether), Dilic (Illick), Endelient (Endelienta), Helie, Johannes (Sion), Iona, Juliana (Ilud), Kenhender (Cynidr), Keri (Curig), Mabon (Mabyn), Menfre (Menefrewy), Merewenne (Marwenna), Morewenna (Morwenna), Nectanus (Nectan), Tamalanc, Tedda (Tetha), Wencu (Gwencuff, Gwengustle, name of Saint Nennocha), Wenheden (Enoder), Wenna (Gwen), Wensent, Wynup (Gwenabwy) and Yse (Issey).

According to Robert Hunt, of the holy children that settled in Cornwall, we learn that the following gave their names to Cornish churches

 Johannes at St Ive
 Endelient at St Endellion
 Menfre at St Minver
 Tethe at St Teath
 Mabon at St Mabyn
 Merewenne at Marhamchurch
 Wenna at St Wenn
 Keyne at St Keyne
 Yse at St Issey
 Morwenna at Morwenstow
 Cleder at St Clether
 Keri at Egloskerry
 Helie at Egloshayle
 Adwen at Advent
 Lanent at Lelant

Irish sources
The Book of Leinster lists the following sons by Brychan's wife, Dína daughter of the King of the Saxons: Mo-Goróc, Mo-Chonóc (Cynog), Diraid, Dubán (Dyfnan), Cairinne (Caian), Cairpre, Iast, Ellóc (Dilic), Paan, Cáemán and Mo-Beóc.

Breton sources
Breton tradition says that Brychan married Menedoc daughter of Constantine, King of the Scots. Together they were the parents of Saint Nennocha.

References

Secondary sources
Thornton, David E. "Brychan Brycheiniog (fl. c.500)." Oxford Dictionary of National Biography. Oxford University Press, 2004.

Further reading
Wade-Evans, A. W. "The Brychan documents." Y Cymmrodor; 19 (1906): 18–50. Available from the Internet Archive.

External links
Brychan of Brecknock at OrthodoxWiki.

5th-century Irish people
Monarchs of Brycheiniog
5th-century Welsh monarchs
5th-century births
Medieval Welsh saints
Children of Brychan
Year of birth unknown
Year of death unknown
5th-century Christian saints
Welsh hermits
Irish hermits